Staining of the nail plate may occur due to nicotine, dyes (including hair dyes and nail polish), potassium permanganate, mercury compounds, hydroquinone, elemental iron, mepacrine, photographic developer, anthralin, chrysarobin, glutaraldehyde, or resorcin.

See also
Nail anatomy
 List of cutaneous conditions

Notes

References
Jeanmougin M, et al.: Nail dyschromia. Int J Dermatol 1983;22:279.

Conditions of the skin appendages